Crossroad is the eighth album by Masami Okui, released on September 4, 2002.

Track listing

Lyrics, composition: Masami Okui
Arrangement: Monta

Lyrics, composition: Masami Okui
Arrangement: Monta

Lyrics, composition: Masami Okui
Arrangement: Yamachi
Happy Place
Lyrics, composition: Masami Okui
Arrangement: Dry
Strawberry Fields 
Lyrics, composition: Masami Okui
Arrangement: Monta
Stillness
Lyrics: Jun Ootomo, Masami Okui
Composition: Jun Ootomo
Arrangement: Yamachi
Mission
Lyrics: Masami Okui
Composition, Arrangement: Monta
Necessary
Lyrics, composition: Masami Okui
Arrangement: Haya10
Be Free
Lyrics: Masami Okui
Composition: Monta
Arrangement: Hideyuki Daichi Suzuki
Bird
Lyrics: Masami Okui
Composition: Hiroto Yamada
Arrangement: Dry
High High High
Lyrics: Masami Okui
Composition, Arrangement: Monta

Lyrics, composition: Masami Okui
Arrangement: Yamachi

Lyrics, composition: Masami Okui
Arrangement: Escargo, Monta

Sources
Official website: Makusonia

2002 albums
Masami Okui albums